Niobe's shrew (Crocidura niobe) is a species of mammal in the family Soricidae. It is native to the Albertine Rift montane forests.

References

Niobe's shrew
Mammals of Rwanda
Mammals of Burundi
Niobe's shrew
Niobe's shrew
Taxonomy articles created by Polbot